The Golden Dove is the second solo album by Mary Timony. It was released on May 21, 2002, on Matador Records.

Critical reception
AllMusic thought that "The Golden Dove puts the 'independent' back in indie-rock: It's beautiful, weird, and difficult to love." The Washington Post wrote that "the songs jump from poetic fantasies accompanied by British-folk arpeggios to earthy resentments over choppy punk chords." The Chicago Tribune praised the "beguiling instrumental color and gentle lyricism."

Track listing
 Look a Ghost in the Eye
 The Mirror
 Blood Tree
 Dr. Cat
 The Owl's Escape
 Musik and Charming Melodee
 14 Horses
 Magic Power
 The White Room
 Ant's Dance
 Dryad and the Mule
 Ash and Alice

References

2002 albums